This is a filmography of Indian vocalist Shaan. He sings in many Indian languages including Hindi, Bengali, Marathi, Urdu, Telugu, Kannada and many others. The list includes the popular songs sung by him in various films, especially in Hindi films.

Hindi film songs

1999

2000

2001

2002

2003

2004

2005

2006

2007

2008

2009

2010

2011

2012

2013

2014

2015

2016

2017

2018

2019

2020

2021

2022

2023

Hindi non-film songs

Albums

Singles

Assamese film songs

Assamese non-film songs

Bengali film songs

Telugu film songs

Kannada film songs

Marathi film songs

Tamil film songs

Malayalam film songs

Other language film songs

Bhojpuri songs

Maithili songs

Odia film songs

Sindhi songs

Gujarati songs

Urdu songs

Other language non-film songs

Replaced Film Songs

See also
 Shaan Discography

Footnotes

References

Shaan